Distorsio decussata, common name the decussate distorsio, is a species of medium-sized sea snail, a marine gastropod mollusk in the family Personidae, the Distortio snails.

Description
The size of the shell varies between 30 mm and 85 mm.

Distribution
This marine species occurs from the Gulf of California, W Mexico to Peru

References

External links
 

Personidae
Gastropods described in 1832